The Old Glynn County Courthouse, also known as the Historic Brunswick Courthouse, is a historic courthouse in Brunswick, Georgia. The building, designed by architect Charles Alling Gifford, was constructed between 1906 and 1907. The building is a contributing property to the Brunswick Old Town Historic District.

History

Background 
There is evidence of a courthouse building constructed in Brunswick, Georgia some time before 1829, and while the ultimate fate of this building is unknown, it most likely burned down. Following this, court activities were held in rented spaces until 1884, when a wooden courthouse was constructed. The building's construction coincided with a growth in activity of the Port of Brunswick, and several years later, in 1892, a new city hall building designed by Alfred Eichberg was constructed. This city hall contained courtrooms that served the city court as well as the county court for Glynn County. There is evidence that in 1897, plans were put forward to construct a new courthouse designed by Frank Pierce Milburn, but a failure by the city to secure a bond issue caused the project to die.

Construction 
Construction on a new county courthouse began in 1906, with New York City-based Charles Alling Gifford serving as the project's architect. Gifford had previously designed much of the Jekyll Island Club, which is also located in Glynn County. On June 20 of that year, city officials accepted construction proposals for the building based on Gifford's design. Construction was completed in 1907. The location for the new building is what is now the Brunswick Old Town Historic District, which is listed as a historic district by the National Register of Historic Places.

Modifications and restoration 
During the 1970s energy crisis, the exterior of the building was covered by a façade to increase energy efficiency. Additional modifications to the building over the next several decades included the installation of sound boards for soundproofing and dropped ceilings. In 1991, a new courthouse was built which partially replaced this building. However, starting in the 1990s, the old courthouse building began to undergo a series of renovations that aimed at returning the building to its historic condition. Phase I of the renovations, which included stabilizing the structure and replacing the copper dome, cost approximately $1 million. In 2001, the renovations entered into Phase II. Phase II, which cost approximately $1.2 million, included the installation of fire detection and prevention systems and bringing the building up to compliance with the Americans with Disabilities Act of 1990. Following this, a Phase III (with a cost of between $1 million and $1.5 million) focused on interior renovations. Following the Phase II renovations, the courthouse served as the meeting place for the county commission.

As of 2019, due to a lack of space at the new facility, the Old Glynn County Courthouse houses the county's probate court.

Architecture 
The building, despite laid out in a cross-like shape similar to Southern Neoclassical Revival courthouses, is primarily influenced by American Renaissance Revival architecture. The building features a brick exterior, limestone stoops at the entrances, and terracotta window-frames. The courtrooms feature balconies, built as a result of racial segregation in the United States.

The building is surrounded by southern live oak trees covered with Spanish moss that partially obscure the building. According to one historian, "the effect of this building today is moody and nostalgic, recalling not the pure light of the Renaissance but a shadowy classical ruin, more emotionally poignant and appropriately Southern than any new structure."

See also 
 List of county courthouses in Georgia
National Register of Historic Places listings in Glynn County, Georgia

References

Bibliography

External links 
 

1907 establishments
Brunswick, Georgia
Buildings and structures completed in 1907
County courthouses in Georgia (U.S. state)
Courthouses on the National Register of Historic Places in Georgia (U.S. state)
Historic district contributing properties in Georgia (U.S. state)
National Register of Historic Places in Glynn County, Georgia
Renaissance Revival architecture in Georgia (U.S. state)